Tzvi Hirsh Eichenstein also known as Hirsh Zydaczower (1763, Sambor - June 22, 1831, Zidichov), was a famous Hasidic Rebbe, a noted Talmudist, Kabbalist and author of novellae on Torah and responsa. He founded the Zidichov Hasidic dynasty.

He was a disciple of rabbis Moshe Leib of Sassov, Menachem Mendel of Rimanov, the Maggid of Koznitz and the Seer of Lublin.

His younger brother was Rabbi Moshe of Sambor.

Among Rabbi Tzvi Hirsh's students were Rabbi Yitzchak Isaac of Komarna, Rabbi Tzvi Elimelech of Dinov (the Bnei Yisaschar), Rabbi Yitzchak Isaac of Zidichov, Rabbi Shimon of Yaruslav, and Rabbi Shalom of Kaminka.

Rabbi Tzvi Hirsh was very passionate about studying Kabbalah, Zohar, and the Kitvei Ari ("writings of Rabbi Yitzchak Luria") in particular. He made a tremendous effort in encouraging  Jews to study these works. With the assistance of his students, some yeshivot in Galicia added the study of Kabbalah to their curriculum. Rabbi Tzvi Hirsh blended the teachings of the Baal Shem Tov with the kabbalah of  the Ari.

His book Ateret Tzvi includes his commentary on the Zohar. In his book Sur Mei'ra Ve'asei Tov (lit., "refrain from evil and do good"), he shows the path to spiritual growth with the assistance of Zohar study and the Kitvei Ari.

Rabbi Yitzchak Isaac of Komarna writes in one of his books that the soul of his teacher Rabbi Tzvi Hirsh is "from the root of the soul of Rabbi Chaim Vital, which is close to the soul of Rabbi Akiva". Once Rabbi Tzvi Hirsh told his brother Rabbi Moshe of Sambor that in one of his "previous lives" he was Rabbi Yishmael Kohen Gadol (one of a series of high priests of the Second Temple, famous for his mystical visions recorded both in the Talmud and in the corpus known as Sifrei Heichalot - literature of the heavenly palaces). The righteous Jews of his generation said he had the soul of the famous Yenukah, mentioned in the Zohar portion of Balak. Another one of his students, Rabbi Yitzchak Isaac of Zidichov, said, "I heard from the holy mouth of my teacher that he was one of the students of Rabbi Shimon Bar Yochai".

Name
The name Tzvi Hirsh is a bilingual tautological name in Yiddish. It means literally "deer-deer" and is traceable back to the Hebrew word צבי tsvi "deer" and the German word Hirsch "deer".

References

1763 births
1831 deaths
Rebbes of Zidichov
Jews from Galicia (Eastern Europe)
Polish Hasidic rabbis
Ukrainian Hasidic rabbis
People from Zhydachiv